SeeThink Films is a Brooklyn-based film production company focusing on documentary and narrative feature films.

SeeThink Films founding members are filmmakers Tom Davis, Luke Meyer, Andrew Neel and Ethan Palmer.

Films 
Goat dir. Andrew Neel (2016)
Breaking a Monster dir. Luke Meyer (2015)
Stand Clear of the Closing Doors dir. Sam Fleischner (2013)
Bluebird dir. Lance Edmands (2013)
King Kelly dir. Andrew Neel (2012)
New World Order dir. Luke Meyer & Andrew Neel (2009)
The Feature dir. Michel Auder & Andrew Neel (2008)
Alice Neel dir. Andrew Neel (2007)
Darkon dir. Luke Meyer & Andrew Neel (2006)

References

External links
 Official site

Film production companies of the United States
Companies based in Brooklyn